768 Struveana is a minor planet orbiting the Sun. The asteroid was named jointly in honor of Baltic German astronomers Friedrich Georg Wilhelm von Struve, Otto Wilhelm von Struve and Karl Hermann Struve.

References

External links 
 Discovery Circumstances: Numbered Minor Planets
 
 

Meliboea asteroids
Struveana
Struveana
X-type asteroids (Tholen)
19131004
Struve family